Niall McDiarmid (born 1967) is a Scottish photographer. His work is primarily about documenting the people and landscape of Great Britain. McDiarmid has had solo exhibitions in the UK at Oriel Colwyn in Colwyn Bay, at Museum of London in London and at the Martin Parr Foundation in Bristol. His work is held in the collection of the National Portrait Gallery, London.

Photography
McDiarmid has published three books of street portraits made in Britain: Crossing Paths (2013), for which he "visited 120 towns and photographed 800 subjects over three years"; Via Vauxhall (2015), which "captures passersby traveling through the rapidly changing neighborhood of Vauxhall" in London; and Town to Town (2017) with more portraits from around Britain. Shore (2020) comprises landscapes, portraits and still lives made on the Essex coast. Breakfast (2021) has photographs of his breakfast table made over for the previous four years.

Publications

Publications by McDiarmid
Crossing Paths: A Portrait of Britain. London: self-published / Hey Little Heroes, 2013. . Edition of 500 copies.
Via Vauxhall. London: self-published / Hey Little Heroes, 2015. . Edition of 350 copies.
Town to Town. Bristol: RRB, 2017. . Edition of 1000 copies.
Southwestern. London: self-published / Hey Little Heroes, 2019. Edition of 450 copies.
Shore. London: self-published / Hey Little Heroes, 2020. . Edition of 500 copies.
Breakfast. London: self-published / Hey Little Heroes, 2021. . Edition of 750 copies.

Publications with contributions by McDiarmid
Professional Photography: The New Global Landscape Explained. Oxford: Focal, 2014. By Grant Scott. . With contributions from McDiarmid, Alicia Bruce, Peter Dench, Chris Floyd, and Jim Mortram.
London Nights. London: Hoxton Mini Press, 2018. . Published to accompany an exhibition at the Museum of London.

Solo exhibitions
British Portraits, Oriel Colwyn, Colwyn Bay, UK, 2016
Here and Now: London Portraits, Museum of London, London, 2017
Town to Town, Martin Parr Foundation, Bristol, UK, January–May 2018.

Awards
2012: International Photography Awards, third place, "Professional: People, Portrait" category, for Crossing Paths - A Portrait Journey Around the UK

Collections
McDiarmid's work is held in the following public collection:
National Portrait Gallery, London: 3 prints

References

External links

"Crossing Paths: A portrait journey around the UK" at the BBC
"Interview: Faces of Our Times: The People of London" at Lensculture
"Crossing Paths - A Portrait of Britain" – 3 minute video on YouTube by Michal Dzierza and McDiarmid
"Niall McDiarmid: Town to Town" – 7 minute video on Vimeo by Elliott Smith and McDiarmid

Living people
1967 births
People from Perth and Kinross
Scottish photographers
British portrait photographers